Steel Toes is a 2007 film directed by David Gow and Mark Adam and starring David Strathairn. It was filmed in Montreal, Quebec, and was produced by Galafilm. The film was based on writer/director David Gow's play Cherry Docs.

Plot
Danny Dunkleman (Strathairn) is a Jewish humanist and a lawyer who works for the court system in Canada. He is assigned to defend Mike Downey (Andrew Walker), a neo-Nazi skinhead who is accused of a brutal, racially motivated murder. Behind prison walls, the two have a clash of ideologies as Dunkleman attempts to put his professional beliefs before his personal beliefs, and his client clings to his hateful beliefs.

Reception
Dennis Schwartz gave it a grade C+.

Awards
 Dworkin Prize Winner for the Promotion of Tolerance
 Best Feature Film, Beverly Hills Film Festival
 Best New Film, Gottlieb Prize Winner, Jewish Film Festival Detroit
 Best Screenplay, Method Fest Film Festival, LA
 Best Actor, Andrew W. Walker, Whistler Film Fest
 Best Feature (non studio affiliated) Cine Golen Eagle Award, 2007
 Achievement in Independent Cinema, Houston World Fest
 Official Selection:  USA Film Festival, Ashland Independent Film Festival, World Houston Film Festival, Tiburon International Film Festival, Woodstock Film Festival (incomplete list).

References

External links
 
 
 

Canadian drama films
Films shot in Montreal
Quebec films
Films about neo-Nazis
English-language Canadian films
2007 drama films
2007 films
Films about Jews and Judaism
2006 films
Films about racism
2006 drama films
2000s English-language films
2000s Canadian films